Petra Collins (born December 21, 1992) is a Canadian artist, director of photography, fashion model and actress who rose to prominence in the early 2010s. Her photography is characterized by a feminine, dreamlike feel, informed in part by a female gaze approach. She was a resident photographer for Rookie magazine and a casting agent for Richard Kern. She has also directed a number of short films, including music videos for Carly Rae Jepsen, Lil Yachty, Selena Gomez, Cardi B, and Olivia Rodrigo. She directed the music video for Rodrigo's song "Good 4 U", which as of January 2022 has amassed over 300 million views on YouTube. In 2016, Collins was chosen as a face of Gucci. She has been labeled an "it girl" by photographer and mentor Ryan McGinley and by Vanity Fair and The New Yorker magazines.

Early life
Collins was raised in Toronto, where she attended Rosedale Heights School of the Arts. It was at Rosedale at the age of 15, Collins began practicing the art of photography. Collins attended Ontario College of Art and Design for two years to study artistic criticism and curatorial practice.

Early career
Collins began taking pictures in high school. She met Richard Kern while assisting him on a shoot, and he became her mentor. Simultaneously, Collins became a frequent subject of the photographer Ryan McGinley, and would go on to become one of his proteges. Collins began venturing into the art world, appearing in shows that featured her own work, and curating shows featuring her art collective, The Ardorous. Coinciding with the time of Collins's rising success in the art world, her Instagram account was removed from the platform after the artist posted a photo of herself unwaxed in a bikini. Following the removal of her account, Collins wrote an essay for Oyster Magazine, later republished in The Huffington Post, speaking out against the misogyny which informs media depictions of women's bodies. In 2014, Collins' first solo exhibition, "Discharge", a photo series spanning between 2008 and 2014, from ages 15–21, was hosted at the Capricious 88 Gallery in New York. Collins went on to publish the photo series as a book with Capricious Publishing in 2014.

Art and photography

In 2010, Collins created the website "The Ardorous" as an online platform for young female artists. Reacting to the male-dominated art world, the group's goal is to question contemporary ideologies of femininity and recast women in positive, empowered roles. Collins has also edited a book called Babe with a foreword by Tavi Gevinson, which is a culmination of over 30 international artists selected by Petra. .

Petra Collins has been featured and curated over a dozen shows since 2011, spanning from galleries in New York, to Miami's Art Basel, to shows at San Francisco's Ever Gold [Projects] in conjunction with SFAQ. She is a frequent editorial photographer for such publications as Vogue, Purple Magazine, i-D Magazine, Wonderland Magazine, Dazed & Confused, L'Officiel, Elle, and Love Magazine. She has also photographed campaigns for brands such as Levi's, Adidas, Cos, Calvin Klein, and Stella McCartney.

In 2016, Collins was named one of Dazed & Calvin Klein's 100 Creatives Shaping Youth Culture and one of Vogue's 40 Creatives To Watch in 2016. Collins was also named one of 30 Artists to Watch by Artsy.

On Saturday, March 18, 2017, Collins collaborated with the artist Madelyne Beckles at The Museum of Modern Art in New York City, New York with their performance piece "In Search of Us". It was a live, 3-hour long tableau hosted on Instagram, that featured live music by JunglePussy and a set by DJ Madeline Poole. The piece draws inspiration from the 1992 Essay "Olympia's Maid: Reclaiming Black Female Subjectivity" by Lorraine O'Grady. The live performance celebrates the female form as the performers confront traditional representations of the female form throughout the canon of historical art.

Collins hosted her first public art piece with Contact Photo on April 29, 2017, at King and Spadina in Toronto, Canada. She completed her first featured narrative film in 2021.

Directing 
In 2015, she directed a three-part documentary series entitled Making Space, which documents and explores what it means to be a young person in today's constantly changing, hyperconnected world. Other projects Collins has directed include Carly Rae Jepsen's music video for her 2015 single "Boy Problems", Cardi B's 2018 single "Bartier Cardi" and Olivia Rodrigo's 2021 single "good 4 u" and "brutal". She has also directed advertisements for Gucci, Adidas, and Nordstrom.

Filmography

2012 
 Trust - "Heaven" (music video)

2015 
 Carly Rae Jepsen – "Boy Problems" (music video)
 Adidas StellaSport – "Break a Sweat" (film)
 Making Space – "Time Will Tell" feat. Blood Orange (music video)
 Making Space Part 3 of 3 (film)
 Making Space Part 2 of 3 (film)
 Making Space Part 1 of 3 (film)
 Drive Time for COS (film)

2016 
 Georgia O'Keeffe – Interpreted by Petra Collins (film)
 Lil' Yachty – "All In" (film)
 Lil' Yachty – "Keep Sailing" (music video)

2017 
 Hungarian Dream for Gucci Eyewear (film)
 Spring 2017 at Nordstrom (film)
 Selena Gomez – "Fetish" (music video)

2018 
 Cardi B – "Bartier Cardi" (music video)
 "A Love Story" (short film)

2021 
 Olivia Rodrigo – "good 4 u" (music video)
 Olivia Rodrigo - "brutal" (music video)

TBD 
 Spiral (film)

Modeling and acting
In 2014 and 2015, Collins was cast in a supporting role in Amazon's award-winning TV series, Transparent.

Collins has previously been featured as a model in Calvin Klein's campaign.

In 2016, Petra was tapped as a new face of Gucci, and walked in their 2016 F/W Fashion Show in Milan. She also starred in their 2016 F/W campaign.

Literary work
Collins' first book, Discharge, was published by Capricious Publishing. The series was first an exhibition of the same name, hosted at the Capricious 88 gallery.

Her second book, Babe, an art and photography collection featuring the work of thirty female artists from around the world, including her own, was published in 2015 by Random House.

In a review of Babe for HelloGiggles.com, Lilian Min wrote that out of the female artists producing work about feminism and sexuality, Collins "in particular has set the tone for a certain kind of introspective, dreamy, but never concealing female gaze". She called Beth Hoeckel's collages "beautifully composed". Natasha Zedan of Musée described the book as "an artistic support system [...] Images like Sailor Moon which cater specifically to women are given new life as they are warped and repainted with looming nightmarish figures juxtaposed with their original renderings." She praised Clair Milbrath's photos as well as the different methods of expression throughout the collection, arguing, "These women have taken everything that has been served to them, heartbreak, pressures, and the general despair of teenage girlhood and turned it into poetry, beautiful, selective, and imaginative."

Process
When shooting photography, Collins exclusively uses 35mm film.

References

1992 births
Living people
Artists from Toronto
Canadian music video directors
Canadian photographers
Canadian women photographers
Female music video directors